Duck Island, a small barrier island, lies 1.5 km north of Swan Island and south of Edwards Point in the main entrance to Swan Bay from Port Phillip in southern Victoria, Australia. It is part of the Port Phillip Heads Marine National Park and the plants and animals on and around the island are protected, including the critically endangered orange-bellied parrot.  The island is part of the Swan Bay and Port Phillip Bay Islands Important Bird Area, identified as such by BirdLife International.

See also
 Swan Bay

External links
Department of Primary Industries

References

Islands of Victoria (Australia)
Port Phillip
Bellarine Peninsula
Important Bird Areas of Victoria (Australia)